In his work on set theory, Georg Cantor denoted the collection of all cardinal numbers by the last letter of the Hebrew alphabet,  (transliterated as Tav, Taw, or Sav.)  As Cantor realized, this collection could not itself have a cardinality, as this would lead to a paradox of the Burali-Forti type.  Cantor instead said that it was an "inconsistent" collection which was absolutely infinite.

See also 
 Taw (letter)
 Aleph number
 Absolute Infinite

References

Cardinal numbers